Ion Ciocan (born February 19, 1850, Mocod - September 6, 1915, Budapest) was a politician and professor from Austro-Hungary. He served as member of the Parliament of Hungary (1896–1901, 1903–1915).

Biography
Ion Ciocan was born on February 19, 1850, Mocod, then in the Austrian Empire. He graduated from the University of Budapest in 1874. He worked for Albina in Budapest (1874–1878) and after 1878 for a school from Năsăud. In 1886 became the president of the Fondurile şcolare năsăudene. He was a member of the Parliament of Hungary (1896–1901, 1903–1915). He also taught Romanian language at the University of Budapest (1898–1909).

Awards
 He received the cross of the Knights of the Order of Franz Joseph, 1890

References

Bibliography 
Gavrilă Tomi, „Ion Ciocan. La 90 de ani de la trecerea sa în nefiinţă” în Arhiva Someşană, nr.4/2005
Ioan Păcurariu, „Ion Ciocan. Viaţa, caracteristica, moartea şi funerariile lui”, în Raportul al LIII-lea despre gimnaziul superior fundaţional din Naszód-Năsăud pentru annul şcolar 1915–1916, publicat de: Ioan Gheţie, director gimnazial
Katalin Kese, „Istoricul catedrei de Filologie română din Budapesta” in Tribuna, nr 17/1995

1850 births
1915 deaths
People from Bistrița-Năsăud County
Romanian schoolteachers
Romanian Greek-Catholics
Budapest University alumni
Romanian writers
Ethnic Romanian politicians in Transylvania